Martina Gambiraža (born 27 November 1982 in Zadar, SFR Yugoslavia) is a Croatian female basketball player.

External links
Profile at eurobasket.com

1982 births
Living people
Basketball players from Zadar
Croatian women's basketball players
Point guards
Shooting guards
ŽKK Gospić players